Nicolas Chalmet (born 12 September 1988) is a Saint-Martinois international footballer who plays as an attacking midfielder for Australian club Manningham United Blues.

References

External links
 
 

1988 births
Living people
Saint Martinois footballers
Saint Martin expatriate footballers
Saint Martin international footballers
Association football midfielders